Dylan James Christopher Levitt (born 17 November 2000) is a Welsh professional footballer who plays as a midfielder for Scottish Premiership club Dundee United and the Wales national team.

Levitt is a graduate of the Manchester United youth system. He made his senior debut in a UEFA Europa League match in November 2019, which was his only first-team appearance for Manchester United. He spent time on loan at Charlton Athletic, Croatian club Istra 1961 and Dundee United. In July 2022, he joined Dundee United on a permanent deal.

Levitt represented Wales at several youth levels, before making his senior international debut in a UEFA Nations League game against Finland in September 2020.

Club career

Manchester United
Levitt joined the Manchester United youth system at the age of eight and signed his first professional contract with the club in April 2018. In November 2019, he signed a new contract with the club until June 2022. He made his senior debut with United in a UEFA Europa League match against Astana on 28 November 2019.

On 8 September 2020, Levitt was sent on a season-long loan to Charlton Athletic. On 8 January 2021, it was reported that Levitt's loan at Charlton Athletic had been cut short after he made only five first-team appearances at the League One club.

On 15 February 2021, Levitt joined Prva HNL side Istra 1961 on loan for the remainder of the 2020–21 season. On 14 April, he was unexpectedly given a chance by coach Danijel Jumić in the Croatian Cup semi-final against Rijeka, being named in the starting lineup. He played until 64th minute when he was replaced by Dino Halilović, as Istra managed to pull off an upset 3–2 win and qualify for the final.

Dundee United
On 20 August 2021, Levitt joined Scottish Premiership club Dundee United on a season-long loan. After scoring six goals in 29 league and cup appearances for the Tangerines, including an extra-time winner against Kilmarnock in the fourth round of the 2021–22 Scottish Cup, and three in the final five league matches to help Dundee United qualify for European football, Levitt was voted the fans' player of the year. He then joined the club on a two-year deal in July 2022.

International career
Levitt represented Wales at under-17, under-19 and under-21 levels. In May 2019, he was called up to the Wales senior squad for the first time. He made his debut on 3 September 2020, in a 1–0 2020–21 UEFA Nations League B away win against Finland. In May 2021, he was selected in Wales' 26-man squad for UEFA Euro 2020. He made his tournament debut as a late substitute in Wales' 1–0 defeat against Italy in Rome. In November 2022, he was named in the Wales squad for the 2022 FIFA World Cup.

Career statistics

Club

International

References

External links

Profile at the Manchester United F.C. website

2000 births
Living people
Association football midfielders
Charlton Athletic F.C. players
Croatian Football League players
English Football League players
Expatriate footballers in Croatia
Manchester United F.C. players
NK Istra 1961 players
Sportspeople from Mold, Flintshire
UEFA Euro 2020 players
2022 FIFA World Cup players
Wales international footballers
Wales under-21 international footballers
Wales youth international footballers
Welsh expatriate footballers
Welsh expatriate sportspeople in Croatia
Welsh footballers
Dundee United F.C. players
Scottish Professional Football League players